Sahana Kumari Nagaraj Gobbargumpi (born 6 March 1982) is an Indian athlete who competes in the high jump event. She holds the current national record of 1.92 m.

Personal life
Sahana was born in Kotekar village in Dakshina Kannada, Karnataka. She attended Anandashram High School, Someshwar. She began taking part in different sports like kabaddi, kho kho, and high jump during her school days. According to Sahana, it was her school that "encouraged her to take up sports". She graduated from Sri Gokarnanatheshwara College of Mangalore in 2002. Her elder sister Harshini is also a former athlete and her brother plays volleyball. She learned high jump from her father, who at that time was in Indian Air Force.

She is married to national level athlete B.G. Nagaraj and they have a daughter named Pavana. She is a senior clerk in South Western Railway Zone.

2012 Summer Olympics
Sahana was the last Indian athlete to qualify for the London Games. She earned the B standard Olympic berth at the 52nd National Inter-State Senior Athletics Championships held in G. M. C. Balayogi Athletic Stadium, Hyderabad, from 23 to 26 June 2012. She broke an eight-year-old national record of 1.91 m set by Keralite Bobby Aloysius.

Sahana had wanted her Ukrainian coach Nikhil Evgeny to accompany her to the Games but the National Olympic Committee of India, Indian Olympic Association, had only sanctioned a quota of five athletic coaches. The Athletics Federation of India approved chief national athletic coach Bahadur Singh Chouhan, R.K. Gandhi, recommended by three qualified racewalkers, and the personal coaches of Tintu Luka, Vikas Gowda, and Krishna Poonia.

Sahana was unable to reimburse the travelling expenses of her coach. A non-governmental organisation, Ek Aur Prayaas contributed funds for her coach to travel to London.

On 8 August 2012, Sahana was eliminated from the women's high jump competition at the Olympic Games when she failed to clear 1.85 m.

References

External links

Living people
1981 births
Indian female high jumpers
21st-century Indian women
21st-century Indian people
Athletes (track and field) at the 2012 Summer Olympics
Olympic athletes of India
People from Dakshina Kannada district
Athletes (track and field) at the 2010 Asian Games
Athletes (track and field) at the 2014 Asian Games
Athletes (track and field) at the 2010 Commonwealth Games
Athletes (track and field) at the 2014 Commonwealth Games
Sportswomen from Karnataka
Athletes from Karnataka
Asian Games competitors for India
South Asian Games gold medalists for India
South Asian Games medalists in athletics
Commonwealth Games competitors for India